Municipal elections were held in Bethlehem in 2005.

Elected candidates

Unsuccessful candidates

Sources

See also
Palestinian municipal election, 2005

Elections in the Palestinian National Authority
Pal
Beth